Mangaung Metropolitan Municipality is a metropolitan municipality which governs Bloemfontein and surrounding towns in the Free State province of South Africa. Mangaung is a Sesotho name meaning "place of cheetahs", as it was not uncommon for the Basotho to name warrior regiments after ferocious animals. The most spoken language in Mangaung is Sesotho.

Before the municipal elections of 18 May 2011, Mangaung was a local municipality under the Motheo District Municipality. In the 2021 South African municipal elections, held on 1 November 2021, the ANC won 51 out of 100 seats on the Metro Council, while the Democratic Alliance won 26 seats and Economic Freedom Fighters won 12 seats.

Main places
The 2001 census divided the municipality into the following main places:

Politics 

The municipal council consists of one hundred members elected by mixed-member proportional representation. Fifty councillors are elected by first-past-the-post voting in fifty wards, while the remaining fifty are chosen from party lists so that the total number of party representatives is proportional to the number of votes received. In the 2021 South African municipal elections of 1 November 2021 the African National Congress (ANC) won a majority of fifty-one seats on the council.
The following table shows the results of the election.

Mayors of Mangaung
The following people have served as the Executive Mayor of the municipality since its founding in 2000:
Pappi Mokoena (ANC), 2001–2005
Eva Moiloa (acting) (ANC), 2005–2006
Getrude Mothupi (ANC), 2006–2008
France Kosinyane "Playfair" Morule (ANC), 2008–2011
Thabo Manyoni (ANC), 2011–2016
Olly Mlamleli (ANC), 2016–2020
Lebohang Masoetsa (acting) (ANC), 2020–16 August 2021
Mxolisi Siyonzana (ANC), 16 August 2021–present

References

External links
 Official website

 
Municipalities of the Free State (province)
Metropolitan Municipalities of South Africa